Tampara Lake is a  fresh water lake situated on the right bank of the Rushikulya River, near Chhatrapur, the district headquarters of Ganjam district, Odisha, India. The flood waters from the river enriches its biodiversity, thus the wetland supports 60 species of birds and 46 fish species. The lake is instrumental in flood control during the monsoon season. The wetland is an important source of livelihood for the local population and also provides water for agriculture and domestic use as well as for providing passage for local transportation of goods. There are boating and recreation facilities on the site for tourism. The lake has been designated as a protected Ramsar site since 2021.

References

External links
Humuri Tampara- A Sweet Water Lake

Lakes of Odisha
Tourist attractions in Odisha
Ramsar sites in India